The 2021 ARIA Music Awards are the 35th Annual Australian Recording Industry Association Music Awards (generally known as ARIA Music Awards or simply The ARIAs) and consist of a series of awards, including the 2021 ARIA Artisan Awards, ARIA Fine Arts Awards and the ARIA Awards. The ARIA Awards ceremony occurred on 24 November 2021 in partnership with YouTube Music and streamed live on YouTube, and broadcast via 9Now. The main ceremony was hosted by Linda Marigliano at the Taronga Zoo.

The 2021 ARIA Awards inaugurated a new category, ARIA Award for Best Artist, which replaced the categories of Best Female Artist and Best Male Artist. This change is designed to ensure that the ARIA Awards reflect and embrace equality and the true diversity of the music industry in 2021. In making this change the number of nominees for Best Artist were ten. Nominations were announced on ARIA's YouTube channel on 20 October, in a livestream hosted by Brooke Boney. Both the Avalanches and Budjerah had eight nominations, while Genesis Owusu received seven, and Amy Shark had six. Owusu won four categories. No ARIA Hall of Fame inductee was announced. At the split ceremony Boney presented a total of 18 trophies, starting with Music Teacher of the Year on Today in the morning, 16 categories at the Pre-Show (which she hosted at Taronga Zoo), and the inaugural Best Artist at the main ceremony.

Performers 

Performers for the ARIA Awards ceremony:

Presenters 

Presenters for the ARIA Awards ceremony:

ARIA Hall of Fame inductee
There were no inductees

Nominees and winners

The nominees were announced on 20 October 2021 with winners presented on 24 November 2021.

ARIA Awards

Winners indicated in boldface, with other nominees in plain.

Public voted

Winners indicated in boldface, with other nominees in plain.

Fine Arts Awards

Winners indicated in boldface, with other nominees in plain.

Artisan Awards

Winners indicated in boldface, with other nominees in plain.

References

External links
 

2021 in Australian music
2021 music awards
ARIA Music Awards